I Know I'm Funny Haha (stylized as I Know I'm Funny haha) is the fourth studio album by American singer Faye Webster, released on June 25, 2021 through Secretly Canadian.

Critical reception

I Know I'm Funny Haha received a weighted average score of 82 out of 100 from eight reviews on Metacritic, indicating "universal acclaim". Jeremy D. Larson for Pitchfork called it "dazzling" and applauded it for showing "its great depth at its own unconcerned pace".

I Know I'm Funny Haha was listed as the 45th best album of the first half of 2021 by Stereogum.

Lead track "Better Distractions" was listed by President Barack Obama in as one of his favorite songs of 2020.

Accolades

Track listing

A Dream with a Baseball Player
The album's ninth track, "A Dream with a Baseball Player", was released as a single. "A Dream with a Baseball Player" was inspired by Atlanta Braves outfielder Ronald Acuña Jr., on whom Webster (a lifelong Braves fan) had developed a crush, while watching Braves games regularly after her return from her 2019 tour. Lyrics such as "[H]e and I don't speak the same language / But we have conversations in my head... I could just meet him and get it over/ Or I'll just keep wearing his name on my shirt", with the repeated refrain of "How did I fall in love with someone I don't know?" are explained by Webster with "A song about Ronald Acuña Jr., obviously... I guess this song explains what having a crush feels like. Having made up conversations with them in your head even though you don’t speak their language, wearing their team jersey every day, things that make you feel closer to this person that you don’t know at all."

Personnel

Musicians

Faye Webster – vocals, guitar
Anna Bishop – violin 
Harold Brown – drums
Mei Ehara – featured vocals 
Tressa Gold – violin 
Bryan Howard – bass
Jeanette Jang – violin 
Noah Johnson – cello 
Jordi Lara – cello 
Annie Leeth – violin 
Stacy Matthews – violin 
Elizabeth O'Hara – viola 
Adrian Pintea – violin 
Trey Pollard – conductor 
Meredith Riley – violin 
Nick Rosen – keyboards
Schuyler Slack – cello 
Derek Smith – viola 
Jocelyn Smith – viola 
Matt Stoessel – guitar
Jeremy Wheatley – drums
Henry White – horn

Technical
Alex Dejong – recording engineer 
Joe Lambert – mastering
Drew Vandenberg – production, mixing, recording engineer
Faye Webster – production

Charts

References 

2021 albums
Secretly Canadian albums
Faye Webster albums
Lounge music albums